USS Barton (DD-599) was a  in the United States Navy during World War II. She was the first ship named for Admiral John Kennedy Barton.

Barton was launched on 31 January 1942 by Bethlehem Steel Corporation, Quincy, Massachusetts; sponsored by Miss Barbara Dean Barton, granddaughter of Admiral Barton; and commissioned on 29 May 1942, Lieutenant Commander Douglas Harold Fox in command.

Service history
Barton departed the east coast 23 August 1942 and steamed to the Pacific, arriving at Tongatapu, Tonga Islands, 14 September 1942. During October she participated in the Buin-Faisi-Tonolai raid (5 October) and the Battle of Santa Cruz (26 October) where she claimed shooting down seven Japanese planes. On 29 October she successfully rescued 17 survivors of two downed air transports near Fabre Island.

Arriving off Guadalcanal on 12 November 1942 having safely escorted a supply convoy to the island, Barton was ordered to join up with Rear Admiral Daniel J. Callaghan's force of five cruisers and seven other destroyers to repel a force of Japanese warships reported by recon aircraft to be heading down the body of water known as 'The Slot' towards Guadalcanal. Assuming her position in the eleventh spot of the US force just before sundown, Bartons crew settled into their battle stations to wait out the Japanese, expected to arrive around midnight.

As darkness overspread the body of water known as Ironbottom Sound, several tropical rain storms and squalls began to cross the area, limiting visibility for both the Americans and the Japanese as they steamed towards each other, however several American ships were equipped with long range radar systems which began to detect the approaching Japanese ships at approximately 00:30hrs (12:30am). Consisting of two battleships, one cruiser and eleven destroyers, the Japanese fleet rounded the northwestern coast of Savo Island and entered Ironbottom Sound at approximately 01:10hrs (1:10am) and shaped their course for Henderson Field; the American airbase they were sent to destroy. Steaming through a heavy rain squall, the Japanese ships were totally unaware of the presence of the American force directly ahead of them, and the heavy rain prevented the US fleet from sighting the Japanese ships for over an hour after the first radar contact.

Despite the Americans having steamed directly into the middle of the Japanese force, neither side opened fire for almost ten minutes as they passed by each other, with the Japanese ships enveloping the American battle column as they emerged from the darkness in three separate groups. In the second position of the rear, US Destroyer van USS Barton began to train her deck guns and  torpedo tubes on several Japanese ships in her immediate area and awaited the order to open fire from the flagship. At 01:48hrs (1:48am) the order to open fire was precluded when  lit its searchlights onto the cruiser , causing both sides to immediately open fire on each other and starting the First Naval Battle of Guadalcanal.

Now fully enveloped by Japanese battle lines, Barton and  steaming astern, broke to the northwest into the main group of Japanese ships while firing at point blank range on nearby Japanese destroyers and making violent maneuvers to avoid collisions with both friendly and enemy ships in the melee. Barton had just fired a full spread of torpedoes at the battleship  when the light cruiser  appeared suddenly out of the darkness and cut directly across the bow of Barton. Making an emergency stop to avoid colliding with Helena, Barton found herself at a dead stop as her engineering crew tried to get her engines back into gear to get her moving again. However, before she could get underway two 'Long Lance' torpedoes fired by the  slammed into the midsection of  Barton; one in her boiler room and one in her engine room. The massive explosions broke the Barton in two, and both sections sank only minutes after the first torpedo struck, carrying with her 164 men: 13 officers and 151 of her crew.

Awards
In her short six months of active service to the US Navy Barton received four battle stars for her service in World War II.

Rediscovery
The forward section of the wreck of Barton was discovered in 1992 by Robert Ballard, with only the hull section and superstructure ahead of the boiler room found intact. To date the stern section of Barton has not been located.

References

 Brown, David. Warship Losses of World War Two. Arms and Armour, London, Great Britain, 1990.  .

External links
 USS Barton website at Destroyer History Foundation
 navsource.org: DD-599 USS Barton
 hazegray.org: USS Barton
 Roll of Honor

 

Benson-class destroyers
Ships built in Quincy, Massachusetts
1942 ships
World War II destroyers of the United States
Shipwrecks in Ironbottom Sound
Maritime incidents in November 1942
1992 archaeological discoveries
Naval magazine explosions